() is Japan's most famous catering service company. It serves meals throughout Japan. In J. League, LEOC has been the main sponsor of pro soccer team Tokyo Verdy 1969. In August 2003 LEOC was established as a holding company of Sodexho Japan Co., Ltd. by stock exchange.

It is an affiliate company of Mitsubishi Corporation.

External links
  Company website
  Company website

Food and drink companies of Japan
Mitsubishi companies